Klavs Randsborg (28 February 1944 – 13 November 2016) was a Danish archaeologist. He was Professor of World Archaeology at the University of Copenhagen, where he spent most of his academic life. He was also at times Visiting Professor at various British, Dutch and German universities, as well as Washington University in St. Louis. 

Randsborg was considered one of the world's leading figures in Scandinavian and world archaeology. He is best known for his research on the Nordic Bronze Age and Viking Age in Denmark. Throughout his career, Randsborg conducted archaeological excavations in the United States, Europe and Africa. From 1984 he was the editor of the archaeological journal Acta Archaeologica.

Randsborg died on 13 November 2016 at the age of 72.

Selected works
 The First Millennium AD in Europe and the Mediterranean, 1991
 The Anatomy of Denmark, 2009
 The Archaeology of Death (New Directions in Archaeology), 2011
 Bronze Age Textiles (Debates in Archaeology), 2011
 Danskernes huse på Guldkysten 1659-1850 (antologi), 2011
 Roman Reflections (Debates in Archaeology), 2015

References

1944 births
2016 deaths
Danish archaeologists
People from Aalborg
Academic staff of the University of Copenhagen